Robert Charles Tudway (4 July 1808 – 20 October 1855) was a British Conservative politician.

Tudway was the son of former Wells Tory MP John Paine Tudway. In 1846, he married Maria Catherine Miles, daughter of Sir William Miles and Catherine née Gordon, and they had at least one child: Charles Clement Tudway.

Tudway was first elected Conservative MP for Wells at the 1852 general election and held the seat until his death in 1855.

References

External links
 

Conservative Party (UK) MPs for English constituencies
UK MPs 1852–1857
1808 births
1855 deaths